Lake Arrowhead is an artificial lake located in the San Bernardino Mountains on Little Bear Creek, a tributary of Deep Creek and the Mojave River. It is surrounded by the unincorporated community of Lake Arrowhead in San Bernardino County, California.

The lake was originally intended to serve as part of a major waterworks project to provide irrigation water to the San Bernardino Valley, and construction of the Lake Arrowhead Dam began toward that end in 1904. However, the original project was halted due to litigation over water supplies to land owners on the desert side of the mountains. Construction of the dam was completed in 1922 by the Arrowhead Lake Company, a Los Angeles syndicate, as part of a plan to develop the area into a resort.

Use of the lake is currently controlled by the Arrowhead Lake Association, which maintains the lake for the recreational use of its members. Only Lake Arrowhead residents with lake rights may access the water. The Lake Arrowhead Community Services District  withdraws water from the lake for treatment and distribution to local residents for potable use.

Additional Images

See also
 List of lakes in California
 List of reservoirs and dams in California

References

External links
 

Arrowhead, Lake
San Bernardino Mountains
Arrowhead, Lake
Arrowhead
Arrowhead